Sir Hugh Michael Robertson , (born 9 October 1962) is the Chairman of the British Olympic Association and Chairman of Camelot, the operator of The National Lottery. He was formerly a British Conservative Party politician who was the Member of Parliament (MP) for Faversham and Mid Kent from 2001 to 2015. He was the Minister of State for Foreign and Commonwealth Affairs until July 2014, having previously been the Minister for Sport and for the Olympics.

Education

Robertson was educated at The King's School, Canterbury. He then read Land Management at the University of Reading from 1982 to 1985, obtaining a BSc (Hons) degree, before attending the RMA Sandhurst between 1985 and 1986.

In April 2014, Robertson was awarded a Distinguished Fellowship by the University of Reading in recognition of the role he played in the London 2012 Olympics. He was awarded an honorary doctorate from the University of Bedfordshire in November 2017 for his contribution to sport.

Career
Robertson served as an officer in the Life Guards from 1982 to 1995, rising to the rank of Major. Robertson saw active service in Northern Ireland, Cyprus, The Gulf War and served with the UN peacekeeping force UNPROFOR in Bosnia and Herzegovina. He also commanded The Household Cavalry on the 1993 Queen's Birthday Parade and at the 1993 State Opening of Parliament.

From 1995 until 2001, he was a banker with the investment management division of Schroders, then head of new business development for the property division.

Parliamentary career
Robertson was the Member of Parliament for the constituency of Faversham and Mid Kent, a large constituency in Kent, which stretches from the outskirts of east Maidstone to the rural areas of The Weald and Faversham. He doubled his majority at both the 2005 and 2010 elections.

Having shadowed this post in Opposition, he was appointed a Parliamentary Under-Secretary of State as the Minister for Sport and the Olympics in the Department for Culture, Media and Sport in May 2010. In September 2012, he was promoted to Minister of State in the Department of Culture, Media and Sport as the Minister for Sport, Olympic Legacy Tourism and was appointed a Privy Councillor. He took The Equal Marriage Bill through Parliament. In 2013, he moved to be Minister of State at the Foreign and Commonwealth Office responsible for the Middle East, North Africa and Counter Terrorism. He was involved in John Kerry's Middle East Peace initiative, the Iran nuclear deal negotiations and the Geneva Peace process to end the war in Syria. He stood down from government in the 2014 reshuffle and was knighted for his work as Minister for the Olympics during London 2012 and his work in the Middle East.

In January 2015 Robertson announced that he would stand down from Parliament at the next general election.

Post-Parliament appointments
 Deputy Lieutenant of Kent (June 2015)
 Chair of the British Olympic Association (November 2016)
 Chair of Camelot Group (June 2018)

Personal life
Robertson married Anna Copson on 17 May 2002 at the Church of St. Margaret, Westminster. The wedding had to be rescheduled at short notice from 5 April after the death of Queen Elizabeth the Queen Mother. They have one son.

Honours
Sir Hugh has received the following decorations:
  KCMG
  General Service Medal 
  UNFICYP Medal
  Gulf War Medal
  UNPROFOR Medal (Bosnia) 
  NATO Medal (Former Yugoslavia)
 Brunei Meritorious Service Medal.

References

External links
 Sir Hugh Robertson official site
 Debrett's People of Today
 Guardian Unlimited Politics - Ask Aristotle: Hugh Robertson MP
 TheyWorkForYou.com - Hugh Robertson MP
 BBC Politics page

1962 births
Living people
People from Canterbury
People educated at The King's School, Canterbury
Alumni of the University of Reading
Graduates of the Royal Military Academy Sandhurst
British Life Guards officers
British Army personnel of the Gulf War
Members of the Privy Council of the United Kingdom
Conservative Party (UK) MPs for English constituencies
UK MPs 2001–2005
UK MPs 2005–2010
UK MPs 2010–2015
Knights Commander of the Order of St Michael and St George
Deputy Lieutenants of Kent
Schroders people